The 2013–14 VfB Stuttgart season was the 121st season in club history.

Review and events

Fixtures and results

Legend

Bundesliga

League fixtures and results

League table

Results summary

DFB-Pokal

UEFA Europa League

Third qualifying round

Play-off round

Team statistics

Player information

Squad 
The club's current squad:

Squad statistics

Appearances and goals

Minutes played

Bookings

Transfers

In

Out

References

Stuttgart
VfB Stuttgart seasons
Stuttgart